Trevor Purt was a Vice President with IBM Watson Health where he led International healthcare consulting.

He was previously a senior NHS leader working within the wider NHS system in the North of England with a focus on the development of Accountable Care Organisations, population health and wider public sector integration.

He was Chief Executive of Betsi Cadwaladr University Health Board, a fully integrated NHS organisation with an annual budget of £1.3b employing 16,000 staff.

He was Chief Executive of Rochdale Primary Care Trust from 2003 to 2006, and became Chief Executive of Heywood Middleton and Rochdale Primary Care Trust when the PCTs were merged. He supported the programme of Independent sector treatment centres, which a number of other Provider Chief Executives said was unnecessary, on the grounds that it was necessary to increase local choice. Debbie Abrahams who was chair of the PCT at the time resigned while he was there over the use of private health companies in the NHS, which she said were 'destroying the NHS.'  Mr Purt expressed disappointment but said "as an organisation, (the PCT is) fully committed to ensuring patients receive the best possible care when it is needed and where it is wanted".

He was the first Chief Executive of Hywel Dda University Health Board, appointed in 2009. His move from England was reported to have boosted self-confidence of healthcare managers in Wales. He was involved in controversial but subsequently successful service changes which resulted in the closure of the Special Care baby Unit at Withybush Hospital and removal of consultant led maternity services & paediatrics.  He was the subject of criticism in 2013 because he did not sign a letter he sent regretting the death of a patient himself.

He was awarded the title of Professor of Practice Health Management in 2012 by Trinity St David University “for his work in health management”.

In late June 2014 he took over as CEO of the troubled Betsi Cadwaladr University Health Board following highly critical Public Accounts Committee and Welsh Audit office reports, both of which highlighted major legacy issues from previous board and management failures.

Controversies 
 Changes to health services in Flint caused controversy with the closure of the town’s community hospital in 2013, prior to Trevor Purt's appointment, resulting in the loss of 18 hospital beds, leaving the town with none. Trevor Purt said the Board was responding to GPs’ calls for new modern facilities and is working with different professions to  deliver "better care, with more co-ordination, better communication and greater consistency for the people of Flint". A local referendum  opposed to the programme held in 2014 was won by an overwhelmingly majority.
 Mr. Purt was also involved, following receipt of critical Royal College reviews, in controversial changes to maternity services at Glan Clwyd Hospital. In August 2015, it was announced the plans would be subject to public consultation, these plans were however finally abandoned later that year despite both initial Board and a Welsh Assembly support.
 The board was placed in special measures and direct control in June 2015 by the labour led administration. According to the BBC, it was stressed behind the scenes that the special measures were due to a number of cumulative problems and concerns spread over several years that contributed to a loss of public confidence in the board. These included issues involving capital spending that are the subject of a police investigation  and alleged (subsequently unsupported) issues relating to institutional abuse at the Tawel Fan ward at Glan Clwyd Hospital. These problems contributed to an alleged loss of public confidence in the board and, significantly, occurred a month after the loss of a number of Labour seats in the May 2015 general election. Mr. Purt was initially suspended from his post, a move which his union, Managers in Partnership, said would "do nothing" to address "deep-seated" problems at the board. as Mr Purt was not in post when the Capital spend nor the Tawel Fan issues were uncovered and the Mental health unit in question was shut in December 2013, seven months before he started.

His suspension was subsequently lifted but the health board's special measures and direct control was extended until after the maternity services consultation and the National Assembly elections of 2016.

References

Administrators in the National Health Service
Living people
British healthcare chief executives
Year of birth missing (living people)